Radical 145 or radical clothes meaning "clothes" is one of the 29 Kangxi radicals (214 radicals in total) composed of 6 strokes. The radical character transforms into  when appearing at the left side of a Chinese character.

In the Kangxi Dictionary, there are 607 characters (out of 49,030) to be found under this radical.

Evolution

Derived characters

Literature

External links

Unihan Database - U+8863

145
142